Papandreou is a Greek surname. It is the surname of:

 Andreas Papandreou (1919–1996), Greek economist and politician and Prime Minister of Greece.
 Dimitrios Papandreou (1891–1949), Archbishop Damaskinos of Athens.
 George Papandreou (born 1952), Greek politician and Prime Minister of Greece.
 Georgios Papandreou (1888–1968), Greek politician and Prime Minister of Greece.
 Georgios Papandreou (historian) (1859–1940), historian and linguist
 Giorgos Papandreou (born 1969), footballer
 Vasso Papandreou (born 1944), Greek PASOK politician, European Commissioner

Etymology. Probably borrowed from Ecclesiastical Latin papas, from Ancient Greek πάπας (pápas, “bishop, patriarch”), variant of πάππας (páppas, “father”). Andreou (Greek: Ανδρέου [an̪ˈðre̞u]), also spelt Antreou, is a common surname in Greece and Cyprus. It originally meant son of Andrew or son of Andreas. Andreou or Andreu is also a last name in Spain and Italy. Andreou is of pre-Christian Greek origin although in Western Europe it gained popularity during the Crusades (mostly in the form of Andrew) and was also one of the earliest settler names in America.

See also
Many streets and squares in Greece are named Andreas or George Papandreou after the members of the Greek political dynasty.

Greek-language surnames
Surnames
Patronymic surnames